A rhyming recipe is a recipe expressed in the form of a rhyming poem. Now mainly a curiosity, rhyming recipes were a common expedient for homemakers to memorize recipes in the late 19th and early 20th century.

Example: Sydney Smith's recipe for salad dressing
As an example, here is a poem that provides a recipe for salad dressing. The poem was written by Sydney Smith, an English writer and clergyman, a wit and a liberal reformer, who is also known for being one of the founders of the Edinburgh Review.

The poem is as follows:

The poem was reproduced in the book Common Sense in The Household: A Manual of Practical Housewifery by Marion Harland, a pen name of Mary Virginia Hawes Terhune, which was to become the most successful American cookbook at the end of the 19th century, selling over 10 million copies.

Through this book Sydney Smith's recipe became quite popular amongst American cooks, who would know the above doggerel by heart.

Notes

References
The Dictionary of American Food and Drink, J.F. Mariani, Ticknor & Fields, New Haven, Connecticut, 1983.  Library of Congress TX349.M26

External links
, Nebraska State Historical Society
Common Sense in The Household: A Manual of Practical Housewifery by Marion Harland, New York: Scribner, Armstrong & Co., 1873.
Rhyming Recipes Continue To Intrigue Readers, column by poemlearners
poemlearners.us, article by poemlearners — look under "poemlearners"

English poems
Genres of poetry